A mixture is a combination of two or more chemicals, in which the chemicals retain their identity.

Mixture may also refer to:

 Mixture (probability), a set of probability distributions often used for statistical classification
 Mixture (organ stop), a special kind of pipe organ stop which has several pipes to each note
 Bombay mix, called "mixture" in southern India
 The Mixtures, an Australian rock band formed in 1965

See also 
 Mixtur, a 1964 composition by Karlheinz Stockhausen
 Mix (disambiguation)